The Dowco Triumph Street Pipe Band was a Grade 1 competitive and concert pipe band based in Greater Vancouver, B.C., Canada, established in 1971 by former pupils of Pipe Major Malcolm Nicholson, C.M. of the Vancouver Police Pipe Band. The band was dissolved on September 16, 2018 by Pipe Major David Hilder.

History
In the 1970s and early 80s, the band ranked among the best in the world, and under the leadership of Pipe Major Hal Senyk and Lead Drummer William McErlean, Triumph Street placed 5th in Grade 1 at the 1979 World Pipe Band Championships. This achievement was the first time that a band from outside Scotland had won a major prize at the Worlds, in this case 'The Sash' for best drum corps. The band placed 6th in the Medley contest at the 2011 World's, finishing 9th overall.

The Dowco Triumph Street Pipe Band, sponsored by The Dowco Group of Companies, and wearing the MacLean of Duart Weathered Tartan, is a Grade One competitive and concert pipe band based in Greater Vancouver, British Columbia, Canada. Originally established in 1971, Dowco Triumph Street holds the honour of being the first band outside of Scotland to win a major World Championship prize, winning "The Sash" in 1979 under Lead Drummer Willie McErlean.

The band was led by Pipe Major David Hilder and Drum Sergeant Gary Corkin, along with support from Pipe Sergeant Shaunna Hilder and Pipe Corporal Gary Nimmo. Many of DTSPB's members won the 2006 World Pipe Band Championships in the Robert Malcolm Memorial Pipe Band in Grade 2 in a field of 39 bands. Robert Malcolm Memorial Grade 2 folded after the World Championships in 2006, and was reformed with the name Triumph Street in January 2007. The band membership was roughly the same, led by David and Shaunna Hilder and Drum Sergeant Andre Tessier. The band competed in Grade 2 for one year, before being promoted to grade 1 after winning the North American Championships in August 2007. The band adopted the name Dowco in honor of the generous financial sponsorship of the Dowco Group of Companies.

DTSPB are based in Vancouver, with many players from out-of-province. This includes pipers and drummers from Ontario, Seattle, Boston, and South Carolina. Notably, a large contingent of players hail from the UK, led by Pipe Corporal Gary Nimmo.

Andre Tessier led the drum corps from 2007 - 2013. From 2014-2015 lead drummer Peter Hendrickson led the corps. When he left the organization, he was replaced by long-time member Cameron Reid. Though Cameron contributed greatly to the band for nearly 9 years, his tenure as lead drummer was short - he was replaced by Gary Corkin only one year later. Gary Corkin brought with him a UK and Vancouver  based snare corps, save for the midsection, which remains BC-based.

In August 2017, after a one-year break from the World Pipe Band Championships, DTSPB competed and qualified as one of the 12 bands in the Grade 1 final. They finished twelfth overall.

On September 16, 2018, PM David Hilder announced that DTSPB would be disbanded. He cited monetary issues, as the 10-year corporate contract with the Dowco group of companies ended.

Pipe Majors
Sandy Marshall (1971-1972)
Hal Senyk (1972-1983)
Rob Menzies (1983–1988)
Hal Senyk (1988–1991)
Alan Walters (1991–1995)
David Hilder (2007-2018)

Leading Drummers
Willie McErlean (1971-1981)
Scott Robertson (1981–1990)
Tim Gladden (1990-1991)
Bill Saul (1991-1995)
Andre Tessier (2007-2013)
Peter Hendrickson (2013-2015)
Cameron Reid (2015-2016)
Gary Corkin (2016-2018)

Discography
The Bagpipe In Canada
A Dram Before Ya Go! (1986)
With Purpose (2012)

External links
Dowco Triumph Street Pipe Band
BC Piper's Association

References

Grade 1 pipe bands